A subscription library (also membership library or independent library) is a library that is financed by private funds either from membership fees or endowments. Unlike a public library, access is often restricted to members, but access rights can also be given to non-members, such as students.

Origins

In the 18th century, there were virtually no public libraries in the sense in which we now understand the term i.e. libraries provided from public funds and freely accessible to all. Only one important library in Britain, Chetham's Library in Manchester, was fully and freely accessible to the public. However, during the century, there came into being a whole network of library provision on a private or institutional basis.

The increase in secular literature at this time encouraged the establishment of commercial subscription libraries. Many small, private book clubs evolved into subscription libraries, charging high annual fees or requiring subscribing members to purchase shares. Subscription libraries would in turn use these earnings to expand their collections and later create their own publications. Unlike a public library, access was often restricted to members. Some of the earliest such institutions were founded in Britain, such as Chetham's Library in 1653, Innerpeffray Library in 1680 and Thomas Plume's Library in 1704. In the American colonies, the Library Company of Philadelphia was started in 1731 by Benjamin Franklin in Philadelphia, Pennsylvania. By paying an initial fee and annual dues, members had access to books, maps, fossils, antique coins, minerals, and scientific instruments. This library began with 50 members, swelled to 100 quickly, and then grew prosperous enough to begin to publish its own books.  When the Continental Congress met in Philadelphia, they did so in the same building as Franklin's Library Company and delegates were given member privileges for the library.  Franklin's subscription library became so popular that many subscription libraries were founded in the colonies, making him remark that it was, “the mother of all the North American subscription libraries, now so numerous.”

The first subscription library in Canada, The Quebec Library/Bibliotheque de Quebec, opened in 1783.

The materials available to subscribers tended to focus on particular subject areas, such as biography, history, philosophy, theology and travel, rather than works of fiction, particularly the novel.

Subscription libraries were democratic in nature; created by and for communities of local subscribers who aimed to establish permanent collections of books and reading materials, rather than selling their collections annually as the circulating libraries tended to do, in order to raise funds to support their other commercial interests. Even though the subscription libraries were often founded by reading societies, committees, elected by the subscribers, chose books for the collection that were general, rather than aimed at a particular religious, political or professional group. The books selected for the collection were chosen because they would be mutually beneficial to the shareholders. The committee also selected the librarians who would manage the circulation of materials.

Subscription libraries were also referred to as 'proprietary' libraries due to the expectation that subscribers not only pay an annual fee, but that they must also invest in shares. These shares could be transferred by sale, gift or bequest. Many could not afford to purchase shares to become a member, even though they may have belonged to reading clubs.

Circulating libraries

The increasing production and demand for fiction promoted by rising literacy rates and the expansion of commercial markets, led to the rise of circulating libraries, which met a need that subscription libraries did not fulfill.

William Bathoe opened his commercial venture at two locations in London in 1737, and claimed to have been 'the Original Circulating library'. An early circulating library may even have been established in the mid-17th century; in an edition of "Tom Tyler and his Wife" in 1661 Francis Kirkman included a catalogue of 690 plays which he claimed to be ready to lend "upon reasonable considerations" from his premises in Westminster.

Circulating libraries charged subscription fees to users and offered serious subject matter as well as the popular novels, thus the difficulty in clearly distinguishing circulating from subscription libraries. Occasionally subscription libraries called themselves 'circulating libraries', and vice versa.

"Many ordinary circulating libraries might call themselves 'subscription' libraries because they charged a subscription, while the earliest private subscription libraries, such as Leeds, Warrington, or Liverpool, describe themselves as 'circulating' libraries in their titles. Since many circulating libraries called themselves after the town where they were situated, it is often difficult to distinguish the type of a particular library, especially since many are only known to posterity from a surviving book label, with nothing but the name as identification".

In Britain there were more than 200 commercial circulating libraries open in 1800, more than twice the number of subscription and private proprietary libraries that were operating at the same time. Many proprietors pandered to the most fashionable clientele, making much ado about the sort of shop they offered, the lush interiors, plenty of room and long hours of service. "These 'libraries' would be called rental collections today."

With the advent of free public libraries in the 19th century, most subscription libraries were replaced or taken over by the governing authorities.

Learned societies
In London, numerous scientific dabblers, amateurs, professionals concentrated in the comparatively small geographic area began to form a unique development - the learned society:

"These societies are voluntary associations of men and women who have come together because they are interested in the aims and objects which the societies serve and they feel that they can pursue those interests better as members of a society, rather than as individuals. The libraries therefore have been collected together for the purpose of serving the objects to which the various societies are dedicated and they do this, for the most part, by serving their members".

Learned society libraries were private but were owned by larger groups of people. Materials were often lent or borrowed by qualified individuals or institutions outside the society. Societies were concerned mainly with the sciences, physical and biological, and often cooperated with other groups like the Royal Society.

Exclusive subscription libraries, the world's oldest being the Chemical Society in London, was founded in 1841 for the general advancement of chemistry. Its primary objective was to guide and direct original research in chemistry and to disseminate that knowledge through debates, lectures and its own journal.

Current membership libraries

Australia
 1833: Sydney Mechanics' School of Arts
 1839: Melbourne Athenaeum
 1854: Prahran Mechanics' Institute

Canada

 1824: Literary and Historical Society of Quebec
 1828: Atwater Library of the Mechanics' Institute of Montreal

Ireland
 1922: Central Catholic Library

France
 1920: American Library in Paris

United Kingdom
 1653: Chetham's Library
 1680: Innerpeffray Library
 1704: Thomas Plume's Library
 1741: The Leadhills Miners' Library
 1768: Leeds Library
 1788: Linen Hall Library
 1793: The Literary and Philosophical Society of Newcastle upon Tyne
 1793: Westerkirk Parish Library
 1797: The Athenaeum (Liverpool)
 1799: Tavistock Subscription Library
 1800: Langholm Library
 1806: Portico Library
 1810: Plymouth Proprietary Library
 1812: Plymouth Athenaeum Library
 1813: Devon and Exeter Institution
 1816: Nottingham Subscription Library
 1818: Morrab Library
 1824: Bath Royal Literary and Scientific Institution
 1824: Ipswich Institute Reading Room and Library
 1832: Bradford Mechanics' Institute Library
 1832: Saffron Walden Town Library Society
 1834: Guildford Institute of the University of Surrey
 1839: Highgate Literary and Scientific Institution
 1841: London Library
 1854: Birmingham and Midland Institute
 1889: Saint Deiniol's Residential Library
 1894: Bishopsgate Institute
 1912: Armitt Library
 1928: Sybil Campbell Library

United States
 1731: Library Company of Philadelphia
 1747: Redwood Library and Athenaeum
 1748: Charleston Library Society
 1753: Providence Athenaeum
 1754: New York Society Library
 1795: Lexington (Kentucky) Library Society
 1804: Social Law Library
 1807: Boston Athenæum
 1810: Salem Athenaeum
 1814: Athenaeum of Philadelphia
 1816: New Orleans Library Society
 1817: Portsmouth Athenaeum
 1820: General Society of Mechanics and Tradesmen of the City of New York
 1820: Maine Charitable Mechanic Association Library of Portland
 1820: New York Mercantile Library
 1826: The Institute Library (New Haven)
 1835: Mercantile Library of Cincinnati
 1846: St. Louis Mercantile Library Association
 1853: Congregational Library & Archives
 1854: San Francisco Mechanics' Institute
 1890: Lanier Library Association (Lanier Library of North Carolina)
 1897: Timrod Library
 1899: Athenaeum Music & Arts Library of La Jolla
 1900: Milford Mystery Library of Milford, Ohio 
 1947: Mendocino Community Library
 1999: John Trigg Ester Library
 2015: Folio: The Seattle Athenaeum

References

Further reading

External links
 "Where Greek Ideals Meet New England Charm" - article about subscription libraries in New England, from The New York Times, March 7, 2008
 The Library of Congress preserves a part of the lending stock of an early 20th-century commercial lending library in its Tabard Inn Collection
"Libraries of Gracious Reading, for Members Only"
"The fall and rise of subscription libraries"

 
Types of library